Gemetyube (Keme-Töbe) is a rural locality (a selo) in Gemetyubinsky Selsoviet, Babayurtovsky District, Republic of Dagestan, Russia. The population was 1,516 as of 2010. There are 12 streets. Selo was founded in 1862.

Geography 
Gemetyube is located 13 km southeast of Babayurt (the district's administrative centre) by road. Tatayurt is the nearest rural locality.

References 

Rural localities in Babayurtovsky District